Siphlophis leucocephalus, commonly known as the common spotted night snake, is a species of snake of the family Colubridae. It is endemic to southeastern Brazil and known from Bahia, Goiás, and Minas Gerais states.

References 

Siphlophis
Snakes of South America
Reptiles of Brazil
Endemic fauna of Brazil
Taxa named by Albert Günther
Reptiles described in 1863